Arthur Waugh (1866–1943) was a British author and father of Alec Waugh and Evelyn Waugh.

Arthur Waugh may also refer to:
 Arthur Waugh (priest) (1840–1922), Anglican priest
 Arthur Waugh (civil servant) (1891–1968), British civil servant in India and folklorist
 Arthur James Waugh (1909–1995), British politician

See also
 Waugh (surname)